The Battle of Yaldabaoth (abbreviated as The BOY) is the third studio album by the British deathcore band Infant Annihilator. It was released on 11 September 2019.

Background 
The band released a music video for the album's single "Three Bastards" on 25 July 2019.

Track list

Personnel 
Aaron Kitcher – drums
Eddie Pickard – guitar, bass guitar
Dickie Allen – vocals

Chart performance

References

External links 
The Battle Of Yaldabaothon Bandcamp 

2019 albums
Infant Annihilator albums
Self-released albums